The 1970–71 Sussex County Football League season was the 46th in the history of Sussex County Football League a football competition in England.

Division One

Division One featured 14 clubs which competed in the division last season, along with two new clubs, promoted from Division Two:
APV Athletic
Lancing

League table

Division Two

Division Two featured 13 clubs which competed in the division last season, along with three new clubs:
Bognor Regis Town, relegated from Division One
Pagham, joined from the West Sussex League
Wadhurst, relegated from Division One

League table

References

1970-71
S